"Hold On" is a song by American rapper 50 Cent. It was released on March 18, 2014 as the second single from his fifth studio album Animal Ambition.

Track listing 
Digital single
"Hold On"

Controversy 
The song disses James Rosemond, better known as Jimmy Henchman. 50 Cent and his G-Unit crew have been engaged in a deadly street beef for almost a decade with Jimmy Henchman. 50 Cent mentions the highly publicized beating of Jimmy Henchman's son, allegedly by the hands of G-Unit's Tony Yayo and other members of G-Unit.  He also references a shooting that took place at Tony Yayo's house, where his home was sprayed with bullets by gunman paid off by Jimmy Henchman.

"On the phone I heard 'Ye smacked the shit outta a kid
Now Jimmy got life, go smack him again.
When it's war, it'll be war to the very end
If they ever say we lose, I'll start it again
That sneaky nigga, spray that Semi at your momma crib
With a silencer we couldn't even hear that shit"

Music video 
On March 18, 2014, the music video was released for "Hold On". Directed video Eif Rivera.

Chart performance

References 

2014 singles
2014 songs
50 Cent songs
Songs written by 50 Cent
G-Unit Records singles
Caroline Records singles
Songs written by Norman Whitfield
Songs written by Barrett Strong
Songs written by Frank Dukes
Songs written by Joell Ortiz